This is a chronological list of permanent expeditions to Tiangong space station, a Chinese space station in low Earth orbit from 2021. An expedition to the TSS refers to the crew that is occupying the space station and using it for research and testing. Expeditions can last up to six months and include three during the regular station and six crew members during the time of crew swap. Starting with Expedition 3 (Shenzhou 14), crew rotation will overlap, hence the station will be continuously inhabited.

Expeditions are numbered starting from one and sequentially increased with each expedition. Resupply mission crews and space tourists are excluded (see List of human spaceflights to the Tiangong space station for details). TSS commanders are listed in bold. "Duration" is the period of time between the crew's launch from Earth and until their decoupling from the TSS.

Past expeditions

Current expedition

Future expedition

References 

Tiangong
Chinese space stations